Babichev is a rural locality (a khutor) in Alexeyevsky District, Belgorod Oblast, Russia. The population was 94 as of 2010. There are 2 streets.

Geography 
Babichev is located 39 km southeast of Alexeyevka (the district's administrative centre) by road. Lutsenkovo is the nearest rural locality.

References 

Rural localities in Alexeyevsky District, Belgorod Oblast
Biryuchensky Uyezd